Iceman, The Iceman, Ice Man, or Ice Men may refer to:

People
 The Iceman (nickname), a list of people with the nickname
 Ice Men or Three Ice Men, alternative names for the Ice Saints
 The Iceman, comedian and performance artist

Film and television
 Iceman (1984 film), science fiction film
 Ice Men (film), 2004 film starring David Hewlett
 The Iceman (film), 2012 crime thriller
 Iceman (2014 film), Hong Kong-Chinese film
 "Iceman" (NCIS), episode of NCIS
 Iceman (2017 film), German film

Literature
 The Iceman: Confessions of a Mafia Hitman, a biography of Richard Kuklinski by Philip Carl
 The Iceman, a biography of Richard Kuklinski by Anthony Bruno
 Iceman, a novel by Rex Miller
  Iceman, a novel by Chris Lynch
 "The Ice Man", a short story by Haruki Murakami included in Blind Willow, Sleeping Woman

Fictional characters
 Ice Man (Caminhos do Coração), a character from Caminhos do Coração
 Ice Man (robot), a Robot Master character from the Mega Man series
 Iceman (Marvel Comics), a superhero appearing in Marvel Comics and a member of the X-Men
 Michael "Iceman" Casey, a character in Wing Commander
 Ice Man, a supervillain in DC Comics who appeared in Underworld Unleashed
 "Iceman", the callsign of Lt. Tom Kazansky, a character in the film Top Gun, played by Val Kilmer

Music

Groups
 Iceman (Japanese band), a J-pop group
 The Icemen, a hardcore punk and metal band

Albums
 Iceman (album), a 1991 album by Albert Collins, or its title song

Songs
 "Iceman", a song by Lloyd Banks from Rotten Apple
 "Iceman", a song by Descendents from All
 "Iceman", a song by the Libertines from Anthems For Doomed Youth
 "The Iceman", a song by Macabre from Murder Metal
 "Iceman", a song by Bruce Springsteen from Tracks

Other uses
 Iceman (occupation), a vendor who sells ice from a wagon or cart
 Codename: ICEMAN, a 1989 computer game released by Sierra Entertainment
 Evansville IceMen, an ECHL Hockey team from Evansville, Indiana
 Ibanez Iceman, a guitar and bass guitar model made by Ibanez
IceMan, part of Pixar's RenderMan software

See also
 Canadian Ice Man or Kwäday Dän Ts’ìnchi, the oldest preserved human remains found in North America
 The Iceman Cometh (disambiguation)
 Minnesota Iceman, a purported man-like "missing link" frozen in ice and displayed in and around Minnesota in the 1960s
 Ötzi the Iceman, the oldest known mummy